Robson Vaz Shimabuku, known as Robson (born 26 April 1988) is a Brazilian footballer who plays for LigaPro club Cova da Piedade.

Club career
He made his professional debut in the Segunda Liga for Oliveirense on 20 September 2009 in a game against Freamunde.

On 14 July 2018, Robson moved to Asia, signing on loan with Hong Kong Premier League club Eastern. On 30 June 2019, it was announced that Robson's loan would not be extended.

References

External links
 

1988 births
People from Marília
Brazilian people of Japanese descent
Living people
Brazilian footballers
U.D. Oliveirense players
Brazilian expatriate footballers
Brazilian expatriate sportspeople in Hong Kong
Expatriate footballers in Portugal
Expatriate footballers in Hong Kong
Liga Portugal 2 players
Moreirense F.C. players
Portimonense S.C. players
F.C. Penafiel players
C.D. Tondela players
S.C. Freamunde players
C.D. Cova da Piedade players
Hong Kong Premier League players
Eastern Sports Club footballers
Association football midfielders
Footballers from São Paulo (state)